Ibrahim Abd al-Fattah Tuqan (1905 – 2 May 1941) (also spelled Ibrahim Touqan and Ibrahim Toukan) was a Palestinian nationalist poet whose work rallied Arabs during their revolt against the British mandate. Tuqan was born in Nablus, Palestine. He was the brother of poet Fadwa Tuqan and he tutored and influenced her to write poetry. Ibrahim belonged to the prominent Tuqan family that governed Nablus during the 18th and 19th centuries.

Biography

He attended the al-Rashadiyya al-Gharbiyya School in western Nablus for his primary education, then St. George's School in Jerusalem for his secondary education. He continued his studies at the American University in Beirut from 1923 to 1929. After graduating with a bachelor's degree in literature, Tuqān worked as a professor of Arabic literature at An-Najah National University in Nablus. He spent one year in an-Najah University in 1929 when Palestine witnessed the massive uprising. This event influenced Tuqān to write nationalist poems. He later worked in two jobs as a professor at the American University in Beirut and a sub-director of the Arabic Programme Section of the Jerusalem-based Palestine Broadcasting Service.

In 1937, he married Sāmia ʿAbd al-Hādī, and they had one son, Jaʿfar, and one daughter, Ureib. Tuqān suffered from stomach problems throughout his life and in 1941 he died at the age of 36 from a peptic ulcer in the French Hospital in Jerusalem.

Poetry
Tuqan's career as a poet began during his adolescence. He was greatly influenced by his grandfather who wrote zajal, as well as his mother, who was fond of "heroic" Arabic literature. As he was encouraged by his father, Tuqan was highly interested Qur'an and used to read it every Ramadan. Tuqan published his first poem in 1923 while in Beirut. There, he found that the Lebanese press encouraged him greatly to publish his work. In 1923, Tuqan also published his first ode in Lebanon under the title al-Mumarridat or Mala’ikat al-rahma.

Most of his poems dealt with the Arab struggle against the British Mandate that controlled Palestine since 1922. His poems gained fame in the Arab world during the 1936–39 Arab revolt in Palestine. According to author Salma Khadra Jayyusi, Tuqan's poetry is marked by "sincerity and emotional veracity. His verse clear and direct, the diction simple and well-chosen, and the phrases powerful and often terse."

Here is an excerpt from one of his notable poems, Mawtini, which he wrote during the Arab revolt:

The poem served as the de facto national anthem of Palestine until the country adopted an official one in 1996. In 2004, Iraq adopted the poem as its official national anthem. Many Palestinians still identify with "Mawtini" along with "Fida'i" and consider the former a sort of unofficial second national anthem of their country.

See also

List of notable people from Nablus
List of Palestinians

References

External links

1905 births
1941 deaths
Arab people in Mandatory Palestine
Palestinian poets
National anthem writers
People from Nablus
Ibrahim
American University of Beirut alumni
Academic staff of An-Najah National University
Academic staff of the American University of Beirut
20th-century poets
People educated at St George's School, Jerusalem
Date of birth missing
Deaths from ulcers